Indirect presidential elections were held in Israel on 16 February 1949 to elect the first president of the State of Israel. The president was elected by the 120 members of the Knesset and would replace the president of the Provisional State Council as head of state.

Candidates
There were two candidates:
 Chaim Weizmann: The president of the Provisional State Council and the incumbent head of state, Weizmann was a leader of the Zionist cause and heavily involved in the Balfour Declaration and the Faisal-Weizmann Agreement regarding the formation of a Jewish homeland in Palestine.
 Joseph Klausner: A Jewish scholar and teacher of Hebrew literature at the Hebrew University of Jerusalem.

Results
The election was settled in the first round, with Weizmann gaining an absolute majority. 114 of the 120 members of the first Knesset voted. Weizmann was declared president on 17 February 1949.

External links
Presidential elections Knesset website 

President
Presidential election
Presidential elections in Israel
Israel